Praeglobotruncana is an extinct genus of foraminifera belonging to the family Hedbergellidae of the superfamily Rotaliporoidea and the suborder Globigerinina. Its type species is Praeglobotruncana delrioensis. Its fossil range is the Cretaceous Period.

Species
Species in Praeglobotruncana include:

 Praeglobotruncana algeriana
 Praeglobotruncana alta
 Praeglobotruncana blanfordiana
 Praeglobotruncana bronnimanni
 Praeglobotruncana caryi
 Praeglobotruncana clotensis
 Praeglobotruncana compressa
 Praeglobotruncana delrioensis
 Praeglobotruncana fusani
 Praeglobotruncana gibba
 Praeglobotruncana hessi
 Praeglobotruncana hilalensis
 Praeglobotruncana inermis
 Praeglobotruncana kallakkudiensis
 Praeglobotruncana klausi
 Praeglobotruncana lehmanni
 Praeglobotruncana luzhanensis
 Praeglobotruncana novozealandica
 Praeglobotruncana oraviensis
 Praeglobotruncana primitiva
 Praeglobotruncana pseudoalgeriana
 Praeglobotruncana shirakinensis
 Praeglobotruncana stephani
 Praeglobotruncana svalavensis
 Praeglobotruncana turbinata

References

Foraminifera genera
Globigerinina